The 2022 Towson Tigers football team represented Towson University as a member of the Colonial Athletic Association (CAA)  during the 2022 NCAA Division I FCS football season. They were led by 13th-year head coach Rob Ambrose, and played their home games at Johnny Unitas Stadium in Towson, Maryland. Ambrose was fired at the end of the season, and replaced with interim head coach Lyndon Johnson.

Previous season

The Tigers finished the season 4–7 overall, 3–5 CAA play to finish in a tie for 9th place.

Schedule

Source:

Game summaries

at Bucknell

Morgan State

at West Virginia

New Hampshire

at No. 6 Delaware

at No. 14 Elon

No. 12 William & Mary

at Monmouth

Villanova

at Stony Brook

Hampton

References

Towson
Towson Tigers football seasons
Towson Tigers football